The valleys of Nepal are situated in three physiographic regions: Terai, Hilly, and Himal. As Nepal is landlocked by India on three sides and China's Tibet Autonomous Region to the north, much of its population is concentrated in valleys and lowlands.

List

B 
Barun Valley

C 
Chitwan Valley

D 
Dhorpatan Valley

I 
Inner Terai Valleys of Nepal

K 
Kathmandu Valley
Khaptad Valley
Khumbu Valley

L 
Langtang Valley

M 
Manang Valley

N 
Namche Valley

P 
Pokhara Valley
Pyuthan Valley
Poon Valley

R 
Ripuk Valley

T 
Tsum Valley

See also
Geography of Nepal

References

Valleys of Nepal
Geography of Nepal
Lists of landforms of Nepal